Éric Remacle (Forest, Brussels, 196022 May 2013) was a Belgian scientist and professor at the Department of Political Sciences of the Universite Libre de Bruxelles (ULB). In 2000, together with Paul Magnette, he was awarded the Exceptional Francqui Prize for European Research.

He is to be distinguished from psychologist Éric Remacle (born 1966) author of Le bonheur ou le stress.

References

External links
Eric Remacle (in French)

1960 births
2013 deaths
Belgian political scientists
Academic staff of the Université libre de Bruxelles
Université libre de Bruxelles alumni